Ribes watsonianum is a North American species of currant known by the common names spring gooseberry and  wild gooseberry, found in the US states of Washington and Oregon.

References

watsonianum
Plants described in 1893
Flora of Oregon
Flora of Alberta
Flora of Washington (state)
Flora of British Columbia
Flora without expected TNC conservation status